Boxer mantis is a common name given to various species of praying mantis.  The name comes from the way these mantises move their oversized grasping forelimbs as they communicate with each other.

Communication

When boxer mantises encounter one another, they rapidly tremble their forelimbs, displaying the patterned interior faces to each other and waving them in slow arcs. This is believed to be a way of preventing member of the same species from eating each other.

Species
Acromantis gestri Giglio-Tos, 1915 (Thai boxer mantis, Thailand boxer mantis, Sumatran Acromantis)
Acromantis japonica Westwood, 1889 (Japanese boxer mantis)
Astyliasula major
Ephestiasula pictipes (purple boxer mantis)
Otomantis sp.
Oxypilus distinctus (Beier, 1930) (Gambian boxer mantis )
Theopropus elegans (banded flower mantis, Asian boxer mantis)

See also
Dead leaf mantis
Flower mantis
Grass mantis
Leaf mantis
Shield mantis
Stick mantis
List of mantis genera and species

References

Mantodea
Insect common names